Abdel Galil Hamza (28 December 1923 – 8 August 2000) was an Egyptian footballer. He competed in the men's tournament at the 1952 Summer Olympics.

References

External links
 
 

1923 births
2000 deaths
Egyptian footballers
Egypt international footballers
Olympic footballers of Egypt
Footballers at the 1952 Summer Olympics
Place of birth missing
Association football goalkeepers
Al Ahly SC players